Pimen (Russian Пи́мен, Пими́н) ( — shepherd) is a Greek male given name. Used by Russian Orthodox church monastics.
It may refer to:
 Pimen, Metropolitan of Moscow, aka Pimen the Greek, Metropolitan of Moscow from 1382-1384
 Patriarch Pimen I, (1910 – 1990), 14th Patriarch of Moscow and the head of the Russian Orthodox Church
 Pimen Orlov (1812 — 1865) was a Russian painter